Landsvirkjun, the National Power Company of Iceland, is Iceland's largest electricity generator. Landsvirkjun operates 18 power plants in Iceland concentrated on five main areas of operation.

History 
Landsvirkjun was founded on 1 July 1965 by the state of Iceland and the city of Reykjavík. The city of Reykjavík contributed to the company three power stations on the Sog River. Shortly after its founding construction on the Búrfell hydropower station began. From 1965 until 2005 the purpose of Landsvirkjun was to produce and distribute high voltage electricity. The municipality of Akureyri acquired a 5% share in Landsvirkjun in 1983 and became the third owner. Three hydropower stations on the Laxá River previously owned by the municipality of Akureyri were merged into Landsvirkjun. The hydropower stations Búrfell, Sigalda, Hrauneyjafoss, Blanda, Sultartangi, Vatnsfell, and Fljótsdalsstöð were all built by Landsvirkjun. The geothermal power station Krafla came under Landsvirkjun's ownership in 1985. Through a new electricity act in 2005 the company's Transmission Division became Landsnet, an independent limited company and a subsidiary of Landsvirkjun.  Landsnet owns and operates the Icelandic transmission system and manages the country's electricity system. In 2007 the state of Iceland took over the ownership shares of Akureyri and Reykjavík in Landsvirkjun, turning it into a public partnership, fully owned by the state of Iceland. In December 2012, Landsvirkjun erected two wind turbines, in an area known as Hafið, within the construction area of Búrfell Power Station, in the south of Iceland. The turbines have a total of 2 MW of installed power.

Power stations 

Landsvirkjun has 18 power stations, of which 14 are hydropower stations, three geothermal power stations and one wind power field.

Subsidiaries 

Landsvirkjun has five subsidiaries:
 Landsnet (64.7% of shares are owned by Landsvirkjun) is the transmission system operator (TSO) of the Icelandic high-voltage electricity grid.
 Landsvirkjun Power uses Landsvirkjun's knowledge to conduct consultancy projects in matters related to energy on the international market.
 Orkufjarskipti provides telecommunication services.
 Icelandic Power Insurance is a captive insurance company, which handles insurance and reinsurance for Landsvirkjun's power stations and, in addition, supervises insurance for construction projects.
 Hraunaveita ehf. took on specific tasks in connection with the Kárahnjúkar Project, but now has no operations.

See also 

 List of power stations in Iceland

References

External links 
 

Electric power companies of Iceland